Platter is a solo album released by TISM bassist Jock Cheese (a pseudonym for John "Jack" Holt). All the tracks were written by Cheese and fellow TISM members Ron Hitler-Barassi (pseudonym for Peter Minack)  and Humphrey B. Flaubert (pseudonym for Damian Cowell). Holt plays all of the instruments on the album, excluding drums, and on one track, classical guitar, which was played by TISM bandmate Tokin' Blackman (pseudonym for James "Jock" Paull).

Platter features the social commentary and satire that is also prominent in TISM's works, including satirical references to Christopher Skase, Josh Abrahams and Robert Palmer.

The songs "I Done It with the Drama Teacher" and "Piss in My Pocket" were released as singles, with other tracks from the album as B-sides, to promote the album, while Holt would go on tour with a backing band, Jock Cheese and the Crackers, in 2003. The seven "Just the Straight Dope" tracks are shortened instrumental versions of tracks from the album. 

An excerpt of "Unfair" was used as an unlisted spoken-word intro to TISM's 2001 album De Rigueurmortis, which preceded Platter, while "Totally Addicted to Skase" was written in 1999.

In 2018, Holt would return after several years as a session musician with a new band, The Collaborators, who released a self-titled album the following year (of note, Stephen "Venom" Brown, who played drums on Platter, also played drums on nine of the album's eleven tracks). 

The Collaborators performed their first concert at the Gasometer in Collingwood on 26 October 2019, where they played the entire album along with two tracks from Platter. On 10 December 2022, Platter was reissued on limited-edition yellow vinyl through TISM's current label, DRW Entertainment, albeit without the instrumental "Just the Straight Dope" tracks. The album had previously been reissued on digital services in 2020.

Track listing

Personnel

Musicians 
 John "Jack" Holt – vocals, guitar, bass, keyboards, recording
 James "Jock" Paull – classical guitar on "I Done It With the Drama Teacher"
 Laurence Maddy – additional keyboards, recording, mixing on tracks 1, 4, 6, 11-13, 15 and 19
 Stephen "Venom" Brown – drums

Technical personnel 
 Robert Bell – programming
 Stewart Day – editing, mixing on tracks 8, 9 and 18
 Paul McKercher - mixing on tracks 2, 3, 5, 14 and 17
 Kevin Ross - recording, mixing on "Why Don't You Get A Bigger Set Of Tits?"
 Mat Voigt - mixing on "O Great Rabbit In The Sky"

Notes

References 

2003 albums